Farlow may refer to:
 Farlow, Shropshire, England
 Farlow (surname)
 Farlow Herbarium of Cryptogamic Botany, a herbarium and library at Harvard University

See also
 Farlow and Kendrick Parks Historic District, Newton, Massachusetts
 Farlow Gap, a biking and hiking trail in North Carolina
 Farlow Hill Historic District, Newton, Massachusetts